The Rotterdam International Secondary School, or RISS for short, is an international school located in the Blijdorp area of Rotterdam in the Netherlands. English is used as the medium of instruction.

Students

As of September 2021, the school had around 400 students which has grown since 2017. RISS boasts a wide variety of students from all around the world.  In 2017, 82 countries were represented.

Location

The school is near to Rotterdam Central Station and is housed in a modern, custom-built building. It is part of the Wolfert van Borselen group of schools.

Bentincklaan 294, 3039KK, Rotterdam. It is actually next to Rotterdam Zoo.

Programmes
The school offers the International Baccalaureate Diploma Programme and the IGCSE in the two exam years.

School Principal 
The School Principal is Dr Mónica Gilbert-Sáez.

Levels
The school has 3 main levels, Foundation Course, IGCSE, and IB. 3 years in foundation course (ages 11 – 14), 2 years in IGCSE (ages 15–16), and 2 years in IB (ages 17–18).

References

External links

Rotterdam International Secondary School - World Wide Schools
Rotterdam International Secondary School - European Council of International Schools

 
 

Schools in Rotterdam
International schools in the Netherlands
International Baccalaureate schools in the Netherlands